The Pro Display XDR is a 32-inch flat panel computer monitor created by Apple, based on an LG supplied display, and released on December 10, 2019. It was announced at the Apple Worldwide Developers Conference on June 3, 2019 along with the third-generation Mac Pro. It is the first Apple-branded display since the Apple Thunderbolt Display was discontinued in 2016. It is sold alongside the consumer Apple Studio Display.

"XDR" stands for "Extreme Dynamic Range."

Overview

The Pro Display XDR contains a 6016 × 3384 6K color-calibrated panel, and its rear cover contains a similar lattice pattern to the third-generation Mac Pro. To improve its contrast ratio and HDR capabilities, it uses blue-colored LEDs for its backlight instead of white, at a higher refresh rate than the display itself, and contains a system of "custom lenses and reflectors". The display is available with an optional laser-etched "nano-texture" glass finish to reduce glare. The nano-texture version requires a custom "dry polishing cloth" included with the display and sold by Apple to clean it.
Mounting options are optionally purchasable separately as an accessory, either the "VESA Mount Adapter" or "Pro Stand". Both use a proprietary magnet system to attach the display. The Pro Stand allows for height adjustment and rotation, and includes a lock switch that releases rotation when the display has enough clearance to rotate 90 degrees. The VESA  Mount Mount Adapter allows one to use a VESA-mounted stand. Sensors in the display automatically rotate the user interface to portrait mode. Apple partnered with Logitech to create a 4K webcam that attaches to the top of the display magnetically.

Compatibility
The Pro Display XDR runs at full resolution in high dynamic range with the fifth-generation iPad Pro and the following Macs running macOS Catalina 10.15.2 or later:
 iMac (2019 or later), supports one display (2019, 2020, M1, 2021) or two displays (2020 with Radeon Pro 5700 or 5700 XT)
 MacBook Air (2020 or later), supports one display
 Mac Mini (M1, 2020 & M2/M2 Pro, 2023 or later), supports one display
 MacBook Pro 13-inch (2020, Four Thunderbolt 3 ports or later), supports one display
 MacBook Pro 14-inch (M1 Pro/Max & M2 Pro/Max or later), supports two displays (M1 Pro) or three displays (M1 Max)
 MacBook Pro 15-inch (2018 or later), supports one display
 MacBook Pro 16-inch (2019 or later), supports two displays (Intel, M1 Pro) or three displays (M1 Max)
 Mac Pro (2019), supports two displays (580X, Vega II, W6600X), three displays (W5700X, W6800X, W6900X), four displays (dual Vega II, Vega II Duo, dual W6600X), six displays (dual Vega II Duo, dual W6800X, dual W6900X, W6800X Duo) or ten displays (dual W6800X Duo)
 Mac Studio: (M1 Max/Ultra 2022), supports four displays
 Intel-based Macs with Thunderbolt 3 paired with a Blackmagic eGPU or eGPU Pro or a Sonnet eGFX Breakaway Puck RX 5500 XT or 5700

Macs and iPad Pros with DisplayPort will output to it, including Thunderbolt 2-equipped Macs using an adapter, but are limited to lower resolutions and standard dynamic range. Windows and Linux-based systems supporting DisplayPort can output to it but lack configuration abilities like brightness control.

It provides up to 96 W of host charging for MacBooks. The rear USB-C ports require a Mac with an internal GPU supporting Display Stream Compression (2019 16-inch MacBook Pro, 2019 Mac Pro with W5700X, W6600X, W6800X, W6900X or W6800X Duo, 2020 27-inch iMac, Macs with Apple silicon) to run at 3.0 speed, otherwise they will run at 2.0 speed.

Reception
Shortly after the announcement, the stand came under criticism and mockery for being sold as a separate product, and at what was perceived to be an excessive cost for its function—retailing at $999. Gizmodo noted, "the price for Apple’s Pro Stand is so high, the crowd at WWDC 2019 let out an audible gasp when its pricing was announced, and that was in a room filled with reporters, Apple employees, Apple developers, and other assorted Apple followers who really ought to be immune to Apple sticker shock by now."The Verge jokingly dubbed the Pro Stand "the most expensive dongle ever".

Technical specifications

See also
Apple displays
Apple Studio Display (1998–2004)
Apple Cinema Display (1999–2011)
Apple Thunderbolt Display (2011–2016)
Apple Studio Display (2022-present)

References

External links
 – official site

Apple Inc. monitors
Apple Inc. peripherals